Changwu County is a county in the central part of Shaanxi province, China, bordering Gansu province to the north, west, and southwest. It is under the administration and occupies the northwest corner of Xianyang City.

Administrative divisions
One subdistrict:
 Zhaoren Subdistrict

Seven towns:
 Xianggong, Jujia, Dingjia, Hongjia, Tingkou, Penggong, Zaoyuan

Climate

Transport
China National Highway 312

References

County-level divisions of Shaanxi
Xianyang